Assembly of the Republic can refer to:
 Assembly of the Republic (Mozambique)
 Assembly of the Republic (Northern Cyprus)
 Assembly of the Republic (Portugal)